Summer Tour 2016 was a co-headlining concert tour by American rock bands Weezer and Panic! at the Disco, supporting their respective albums, the White Album and Death of a Bachelor. Beginning June 2016, the bands played over 40 shows in North America.

Opening acts
Andrew McMahon and the Wilderness
Swimming with Bears 
Atlas Genius

Set list
The following setlists were obtained from the concert held July 2, 2016; at the PNC Bank Arts Center in Holmdel Township, New Jersey. It is not representative of all concerts for the duration of the tour.
{{hidden
| headercss = background: #ccccff; font-size: 100%; width: 65%;
| contentcss = text-align: left; font-size: 100%; width: 75%;
| header = Weezer
| content = 
"California Kids"
"Hash Pipe"
"My Name Is Jonas"
"(If You're Wondering If I Want You To) I Want You To"
"Jacked Up"
"Pork and Beans"
"L.A. Girlz"
"Perfect Situation"
"Thank God for Girls" 
"Beverly Hills"
"Dope Nose" 
"Back to the Shack" / "Keep Fishin'" / "The Good Life" 
"Surf Wax America"
"Undone – The Sweater Song"
"King of the World" / "Only in Dreams"
"Island in the Sun"
"Say It Ain't So"
"El Scorcho"
Encore
"Buddy Holly"

}}
{{hidden
| headercss = background: #ccccff; font-size: 100%; width: 65%;
| contentcss = text-align: left; font-size: 100%; width: 75%;
| header = Panic! at the Disco
| content = 
"Don't Threaten Me with a Good Time"
"Vegas Lights"
"The Ballad of Mona Lisa"
"Hallelujah"
"Time to Dance"
"Emperor's New Clothes"
"Girls / Girls / Boys"
"Ready to Go (Get Me Out of My Mind)"
"Nine in the Afternoon"
"Crazy=Genius"
"Miss Jackson"
"Golden Days"
"Bohemian Rhapsody" 
"LA Devotee"
"Death of a Bachelor"
Encore
"I Write Sins Not Tragedies"
"This is Gospel"
"Victorious"
}}

Tour dates

Festivals and other miscellaneous performances
92.1 Fuzz Fest
X-Fest
Summerfest
Chuck's Kegger

Box office score data

References

2016 concert tours
Co-headlining concert tours
Panic! at the Disco
Weezer